Tipiṭaka or Tripiṭaka or තිපිටක, meaning "Triple Basket", is the traditional term for ancient collections of Buddhist sacred scriptures.

The Pāli Canon maintained by the Theravāda tradition in Southeast Asia, the Chinese Buddhist Canon maintained by the East Asian Buddhist tradition, and the Tibetan Buddhist Canon maintained by the Tibetan Buddhist tradition are some of the most important Tripiṭaka in contemporary Buddhist world.

Tripiṭaka has become a term used for many schools' collections, although their general divisions do not match a strict division into three piṭakas.

Etymology
Tripiṭaka (Sanskrit: त्रिपिटक), or Tipiṭaka (Pāli), means "Three Baskets". It is a compound Sanskrit word of tri (त्रि) or Pāli word ti, meaning "three", and piṭaka (पिटक) or piṭa (पिट), meaning "basket". The "three baskets" were originally the receptacles of the palm-leaf manuscripts on which were preserved the collections of texts of the Suttas, the Vinaya, and the Abhidhamma, the three divisions that constitute the Buddhist Canons. These terms are also spelled without diacritics as Tripiṭaka and Tipiṭaka in scholarly literature.

Textual categories 

The Tripiṭaka is composed of three main categories of texts that collectively constitute the Buddhist canon: the Sutra Piṭaka, the Vinaya Piṭaka, and the Abhidhamma Piṭaka.

Sutras were the doctrinal teachings in aphoristic or narrative format. The historical Buddha delivered all of his sermons in Magadhan. These sermons were rehearsed orally during the meeting of the First Buddhist council just after the Parinibbana of the Buddha. The teachings continued to be transmitted orally until eventually being written down in the first century BCE. Even within the Sūtra Piṭaka it is possible to detect older and later texts.

The Vinaya Piṭaka appears to have grown gradually as a commentary and justification of the monastic code (Prātimokṣa), which presupposes a transition from a community of wandering mendicants (the Sūtra Piṭaka period) to a more sedentary monastic community (the Vinaya Piṭaka period). The Vinaya focuses on the rules and regulations, or the morals and ethics, of monastic life that range from dress code and dietary rules to prohibitions of certain personal conducts.

Earlier Tripitakas

Each of the early Buddhist Schools likely had their own versions of the Tripiṭaka. According to some sources, there were some Indian schools of Buddhism that had five or seven piṭakas. According to Yijing, an 8th-century Chinese pilgrim to India, the Nikaya Buddhist schools kept different sets of canonical texts with some intentional or unintentional dissimilarities. Yijing notes four main textual collections among the non-Mahayana schools:

 The Mahāsāṃghika Tripiṭaka (amounting to 300,000 slokas)
 The Sarvāstivāda Tripiṭaka (also 300,000 slokas)
 The Sthavira Tripiṭaka (also 300,000 slokas)
 The Saṃmitīya Tripiṭaka (in about 200,000 slokas)

Yijing notes that though there were numerous sub-schools and sects, the sub-sects shared the Tripiṭaka of their mother tradition (which he termed the "four principal schools of continuous tradition" or the "arya" traditions). However, this does not mean that the various sub-schools did not possess their own unique Tripiṭaka. Xuanzang is said to have brought to China the Tripiṭaka of seven different schools, including those of the above-mentioned schools as well as the Dharmaguptaka, Kāśyapīya, and Mahīśāsaka.

According to A. K. Warder, the Tibetan historian Bu-ston said that around or before the 1st century CE there were eighteen schools of Buddhism each with their own Tripiṭaka transcribed into written form. However, except for one version that has survived in full and others, of which parts have survived, all of these texts are lost to history or yet to be found.

Mahāsāṃghika
The Mahāsāṃghika Vinaya was translated by Buddhabhadra and Faxian in 416 CE, and is preserved in Chinese translation (Taishō Tripiṭaka 1425).

The 6th century CE Indian monk Paramārtha wrote that 200 years after the parinirvāṇa of the Buddha, much of the Mahāsāṃghika school moved north of Rājagṛha, and were divided over whether the Mahāyāna sūtras should be incorporated formally into their Tripiṭaka. According to this account, they split into three groups based upon the relative manner and degree to which they accepted the authority of these Mahāyāna texts. Paramārtha states that the Kukkuṭika sect did not accept the Mahāyāna sūtras as buddhavacana ("words of the Buddha"), while the Lokottaravāda sect and the Ekavyāvahārika sect did accept the Mahāyāna sūtras as buddhavacana. Also in the 6th century CE, Avalokitavrata writes of the Mahāsāṃghikas using a "Great Āgama Piṭaka," which is then associated with Mahāyāna sūtras such as the Prajñāparamitā and the Daśabhūmika Sūtra.
According to some sources, abhidharma was not accepted as canonical by the Mahāsāṃghika school. The Theravādin Dīpavaṃsa, for example, records that the Mahāsāṃghikas had no abhidharma. However, other sources indicate that there were such collections of abhidharma, and the Chinese pilgrims Faxian and Xuanzang both mention Mahāsāṃghika abhidharma. On the basis of textual evidence as well as inscriptions at Nāgārjunakoṇḍā, Joseph Walser concludes that at least some Mahāsāṃghika sects probably had an abhidharma collection, and that it likely contained five or six books.

Caitika
The Caitikas included a number of sub-sects including the Pūrvaśailas, Aparaśailas, Siddhārthikas, and Rājagirikas. In the 6th century CE, Avalokitavrata writes that Mahāyāna sūtras such as the Prajñāparamitā and others are chanted by the Aparaśailas and the Pūrvaśailas. Also in the 6th century CE, Bhāvaviveka speaks of the Siddhārthikas using a Vidyādhāra Piṭaka, and the Pūrvaśailas and Aparaśailas both using a Bodhisattva Piṭaka, implying collections of Mahāyāna texts within these Caitika schools.

Bahuśrutīya
The Bahuśrutīya school is said to have included a Bodhisattva Piṭaka in their canon. This abhidharma was translated into Chinese in sixteen fascicles (Taishō Tripiṭaka 1646). Its authorship is attributed to Harivarman, a third-century monk from central India. Paramārtha cites this Bahuśrutīya abhidharma as containing a combination of Hīnayāna and Mahāyāna doctrines, and Joseph Walser agrees that this assessment is correct.

Prajñaptivāda
The Prajñaptivādins held that the Buddha's teachings in the various piṭakas were nominal (Skt. prajñapti), conventional (Skt. ), and causal (Skt. hetuphala). Therefore, all teachings were viewed by the Prajñaptivādins as being of provisional importance, since they cannot contain the ultimate truth. It has been observed that this view of the Buddha's teachings is very close to the fully developed position of the Mahāyāna sūtras.

Sārvāstivāda
Scholars at present have "a nearly complete collection of sūtras from the Sarvāstivāda school" thanks to a recent discovery in Afghanistan of roughly two-thirds of Dīrgha Āgama in Sanskrit. The Madhyama Āgama (Taishō Tripiṭaka 26) was translated by Gautama Saṃghadeva, and is available in Chinese. The Saṃyukta Āgama (Taishō Tripiṭaka 99) was translated by Guṇabhadra, also available in Chinese translation. The Sarvāstivāda is therefore the only early school besides the Theravada for which we have a roughly complete Sūtra Piṭaka. The Sārvāstivāda Vinaya Piṭaka is also extant in Chinese translation, as are the seven books of the Sarvāstivāda Abhidharma Piṭaka. There is also the encyclopedic Abhidharma Mahāvibhāṣa Śāstra (Taishō Tripiṭaka 1545), which was held as canonical by the Vaibhāṣika Sarvāstivādins of northwest India.

Mūlasārvāstivāda
Portions of the Mūlasārvāstivāda Tripiṭaka survive in Tibetan translation and Nepalese manuscripts. The relationship of the Mūlasārvāstivāda school to Sarvāstivāda school is indeterminate; their vinayas certainly differed but it is not clear that their Sūtra Piṭaka did. The Gilgit manuscripts may contain Āgamas from the Mūlasārvāstivāda school in Sanskrit. The Mūlasārvāstivāda Vinaya Piṭaka survives in Tibetan translation and also in Chinese translation (Taishō Tripiṭaka 1442). The Gilgit manuscripts also contain vinaya texts from the Mūlasārvāstivāda school in Sanskrit.

Dharmaguptaka

A complete version of the Dīrgha Āgama (Taishō Tripiṭaka 1) of the Dharmaguptaka school was translated into Chinese by Buddhayaśas and Zhu Fonian (竺佛念) in the Later Qin dynasty, dated to 413 CE. It contains 30 sūtras in contrast to the 34 suttas of the Theravadin Dīgha Nikāya. A. K. Warder also associates the extant Ekottara Āgama (Taishō Tripiṭaka 125) with the Dharmaguptaka school, due to the number of rules for monastics, which corresponds to the Dharmaguptaka Vinaya. The Dharmaguptaka Vinaya is also extant in Chinese translation (Taishō Tripiṭaka 1428), and Buddhist monastics in East Asia adhere to the Dharmaguptaka Vinaya.

The Dharmaguptaka Tripiṭaka is said to have contained a total of five piṭakas. These included a Bodhisattva Piṭaka and a Mantra Piṭaka (Ch. 咒藏), also sometimes called a Dhāraṇī Piṭaka. According to the 5th-century Dharmaguptaka monk Buddhayaśas, the translator of the Dharmaguptaka Vinaya into Chinese, the Dharmaguptaka school had assimilated the Mahāyāna Tripiṭaka (Ch. 大乘三藏).

Mahīśāsaka
The Mahīśāsaka Vinaya is preserved in Chinese translation (Taishō Tripiṭaka 1421), translated by Buddhajīva and Zhu Daosheng in 424 CE.

Kāśyapīya
An incomplete Chinese translation of the Saṃyukta Āgama of the Kāśyapīya school by an unknown translator circa the Three Qin (三秦) period (352-431 CE) survives.

Pali Canon

The Pāli Canon is the complete Tripiṭaka set maintained by the Theravāda tradition as written and preserved in Pali.

The dating of the Tripiṭaka is unclear. Max Müller states that the current structure and contents of the Pali Canon took shape in the 3rd century BCE after which it continued to be transmitted orally from generation to generation until finally being put into written form in the 1st century BCE (nearly 500 years after the lifetime of Buddha). The Theravada chronicle called the Dipavamsa states that during the reign of Valagamba of Anuradhapura (29–17 BCE) the monks who had previously remembered the Tipiṭaka and its commentary orally now wrote them down in books, because of the threat posed by famine and war. The Mahavamsa also refers briefly to the writing down of the canon and the commentaries at this time. According to Sri Lankan sources more than 1000 monks who had attained Arahantship were involved in the task. The place where the project was undertaken was in Aluvihare, Matale, Sri Lanka. The resulting texts were later partly translated into a number of East Asian languages such as Chinese, Tibetan and Mongolian by ancient visiting scholars, which though extensive are incomplete.

Each Buddhist sub-tradition had its own Tripiṭaka for its monasteries, written by its sangha, each set consisting of 32 books, in three parts or baskets of teachings:  (“Basket of Discipline”),  (“Basket of Discourse”), and Abhidhamma Piṭaka (“Basket of Special [or Further] Doctrine”). The structure, the code of conduct and moral virtues in the Vinaya basket particularly, have similarities to some of the surviving Dharmasutra texts of Hinduism. Much of the surviving Tripiṭaka literature is in Pali, with some in Sanskrit as well as other local Asian languages. The Pali Canon does not contain the Mahayana Sutras and Tantras as Mahayana schools were not influential in Theravada tradition as in East Asia and Tibet. Hence, there is no major Mahayana (neither Hinayana or Pratyekabuddhayana) schools in Theravada tradition. The Tantric schools of Theravada tradition use Tantric texts independently, and not as the part of the Collection.

Some of the well known preserved Pali Canons are the Chattha Sangayana Tipitaka, Buddha Jayanthi Tripitaka, Thai Tipitaka, etc.

Chinese Buddhist Canon

The Chinese Buddhist Canon is the Tripiṭaka set maintained by the East Asian Buddhist tradition is written and preserved in Chinese.

Wu and Chia state that emerging evidence, though uncertain, suggests that the earliest written Buddhist Tripiṭaka texts may have arrived in China from India by the 1st century BCE. An organised collection of Buddhist texts began to emerge in the 6th century CE, based on the structure of early bibliographies of Buddhist texts. However, it was the 'Kaiyuan Era Catalogue' by Zhisheng in 730 that provided the lasting structure. Zhisheng introduced the basic six-fold division with sutra, vinaya, and abhidharma belonging to Mahāyāna, Pratyekabuddhayana and Sravakayana . It is likely that Zhisheng's catalogue proved decisive because it was used to reconstruct the Canon after the persecutions of 845 CE, however it was also considered a "perfect synthesis of the entire four-hundred-year development of a proper Chinese form of the Canon."

Some of the well known preserved Chinese Canons are the Taisho Tripitaka, Tripitaka Koreana, etc.

Tibetan Buddhist Canon 

The Tibetan Buddhist canon is a collection of sacred texts recognized by various sects of Tibetan Buddhism. In addition to sutrayana texts, the Tibetan canon includes tantric texts. The Tibetan Canon underwent a final compilation in the 14th century by Buton Rinchen Drub.

The Tibetan Canon has its own scheme which divided texts into two broad categories:

 Kangyur (Wylie: bka'-'gyur) or "Translated Words or Vacana", consists of works supposed to have been said by the Buddha himself. All texts presumably have a Sanskrit original, although in many cases the Tibetan text was translated from Chinese from Chinese Canon, Pali from Pali Canon or other languages.
 Tengyur (Wylie: bstan-'gyur) or "Translated Treatises or Shastras", is the section to which were assigned commentaries, treatises and abhidharma works (both Mahayana and non-Mahayana). The Tengyur contains 3,626 texts in 224 Volumes.

Some of the well known Tibetan Canons are the Dege, Jiang, Lhasa, etc.

As a title
In Chinese culture, this is notable in the case of the Tang Dynasty monk Xuanzang, whose pilgrimage to India to study and bring Buddhist texts back to China was portrayed in the novel Journey to the West as "Tang Sanzang" (Tang Dynasty Tripiṭaka Master). Due to the popularity of the novel, the term "sānzàng" is often erroneously understood as a name of the monk Xuanzang. One such screen version of this is the popular 1979 Monkey (TV series).

See also

Āgama (Buddhism)
Early Buddhist Texts
Buddhist texts
Pāli Canon
Tripiṭaka tablets at Kuthodaw Pagoda
Tripiṭaka Koreana
Zhaocheng Jin Tripiṭaka
Pali Text Society
Dhamma Society Fund
 Xuanzang

Notes

Further reading

External links
Pali Canon:
British Library has digitised four Sinhalese palm leaf manuscripts (Sinhalese Manuscripts Pilot Digitisation Project)
Access to Insight has many suttas translated into English
 Sutta Central Early Buddhist texts, translations, and parallels (Multiple Languages)
Tipiṭaka Network
List of Pali Canon Suttas translated into English (ongoing)
The Pali Tipiṭaka Project (texts in 7 Asian languages)
The Sri Lanka Tripiṭaka Project Pali Canons has a searchable database of the Pali texts
The Vietnamese Nikaaya (continuing, text in Vietnamese)
Search in English translations of the Tipiṭaka 
New Guide to the Tipiṭaka has summaries of the entire Tipiṭaka in English
 Tipiṭaka Online

Myanmar Version of Buddhist Canon (6th revision):
 Buddhist Bible Myanmar Version (without original Pali text)

Chinese Buddhist Canon:
 Buddhist Text Translation Society: Sutra Texts
 BuddhaNet's eBook Library (English PDFs)
 WWW Database of Chinese Buddhist texts (English index of some East Asian Tripiṭakas)
 Tripiṭaka Titles and Translations in English
 CBETA: Full Chinese language canon and extended canon (includes downloads)

Tibetan tradition:
Kangyur & Tengyur Projects (Tibetan texts)
Kangyur & Tengyur Translating Projects (Tibetan texts)

Tripiṭaka collections:
 Extensive list of online Tripiṭakas
 Theravada Buddhism Tipiṭaka 

Sri Lankan version of Tipiṭaka:
 Buddha Jayanthi Edition of Tipiṭaka in Sinhala (Sri Lankan version)
 Tipiṭaka in Sinhala (Sri Lankan version)